The billiards and snooker competitions at the 2017 Southeast Asian Games in Kuala Lumpur took place at Kuala Lumpur Convention Centre in Kuala Lumpur City Centre.

The 2017 Games featured competitions in five events (all events for men).

Men's English billiards singles

Knockout round

Finals

Section 1

Section 2

Men's nine-ball singles

Knockout round

Finals

Section 1

Section 2

Men's nine-ball doubles

Knockout round

Finals

Section 1

Section 2

Men's snooker singles

Knockout round

Finals

Section 1

Section 2

Men's snooker doubles

Knockout round

Finals

Section 1

Section 2

References

External links
  

Results